Robert V. Barron (born Robert V. Nemiroff; December 26, 1932 – December 1, 2000) was an American TV and film director, producer, screenwriter and actor. He was best known for his role as the voice of Admiral Donald Hayes in 1980s animated TV series Robotech, of which he also served as the producer. He is also well known for playing Abraham Lincoln in the 1989 comedy film Bill & Ted's Excellent Adventure.

Career
Barron attended Morris Harvey College in Charleston, West Virginia, and UCLA. He subsequently trained at American Academy of Dramatic Arts in New York City, and at Max Reinhardt Workshop in Los Angeles.

He got his entertainment start in radio, co-producing a two-hour Saturday morning radio program, the "Bop Shop," which aired for two years on radio station WGKV-AM (later WHMS and WXIT, now WSWW (AM)) in his hometown of Charleston, West Virginia.

Before permanently moving to California and beginning his Hollywood work, he spent several years in regional theater across the U.S. He built an impressive resumé of glowing reviews of his performances in such roles as Cyrano de Bergerac, Abe Lincoln In Illinois, Sir Thomas More in A Man For All Seasons, Henry Drummond in Inherit The Wind, Richard III, but was never offered major roles in films or television.

In Hollywood, he made acting appearances in television shows such as Quantum Leap, Get a Life, Father Dowling Mysteries, and movies such as The Spring and A Dangerous Place. He also wrote episodes of the NBC television western series Bonanza and the CBS-TV western/spy series Wild, Wild West. Perhaps his best-remembered television script was his first, a lighthearted comedy episode of Bonanza, "Hoss and The Leprechauns." 

As a writer, Barron drifted into adapting English dubbing scripts of foreign films. American producers began buying successful Japanese animated series and dubbing them in English, and Barron was a pioneer in that industry, which grew rapidly and enormously. He became executive director and story editor for Saban Productions, which in five years became one of the world's largest producers of children's programming, with such shows as X-Men (1992) and Mighty Morphin' Power Rangers (1993).
 
He also made appearances on TV series such as Bonanza, Mannix, Love American Style and Night Court, and played a pool player in an episode of CBS-TV's Dukes of Hazzard.

He also co-wrote the standard song "Cindy, Oh Cindy" with Bert Long.

Death

Barron died in December 1, 2000 at age 67 in Salinas, California, and was interred in Salinas's Garden of Memories Memorial Park.

Filmography

Anime

Film

Television

Video games

References

External links

Robert V. Barron - a personal appreciation from a friend
Robert Barron tribute page at Bill and Ted website

1932 births
2000 deaths
American male film actors
American male television actors
American male voice actors
Robotech cast and crew
20th-century American male actors
American television writers
American male screenwriters
American television directors
American television producers
American film producers
American voice directors
Screenwriters from West Virginia
American male television writers
Morris Harvey College alumni
Film directors from West Virginia
20th-century American male writers
20th-century American screenwriters